Oso is a census-designated place (CDP) in Snohomish County, Washington, United States. It is located to the west of Darrington, south of the North Fork of the Stillaguamish River and approximately 50 air miles (80 km) from Seattle. The population of Oso was 180 at the 2010 census. The area was the site of a large landslide in March 2014 that killed 43 people, the deadliest incident of its kind in U.S. history.

Geography

Oso is located along the Stillaguamish River North Fork, which forms a valley between several arms of the Cascade Range.

Oso is located at  (48.272281, −121.919235). The United States Census Bureau defines the Oso CDP as extending north from the river to the Skagit County border. It has a total area of 3.7 square miles (9.6 km2), of which, 3.6 square miles (9.4 km2) of it is land and 0.1 square miles (0.2 km2) of it (2.43%) is water.

History
The town was originally named Allen, but was renamed to Oso to avoid confusion with Allyn in Mason County. Oso is Spanish for bear and was named by J. P. Britzius after the town of Oso, Texas in Fayette County. The Texas town no longer exists, having been abandoned in favor of the nearby town of Flatonia which had a railway station.

2014 mudslide

Forty-three people were killed.

2016 wildfire
A wildfire grew off Washington State Route 530 near Oso. As of May 13, 2016, the wildfire had spread to
over 100 acres.

Demographics
As of the census of 2000, there were 326 people, 96 households, and 69 families residing in the CDP. The population density was 68.0 people per square mile (26.2/km2). There were 102 housing units at an average density of 28.2/sq mi (10.9/km2). The racial makeup of the CDP was 99.19% White, 0.41% African American, and 0.41% from other races. Hispanic or Latino of any race were 0.41% of the population.

There were 96 households, out of which 37.5% had children under the age of 18 living with them, 60.4% were married couples living together, 8.3% had a female householder with no husband present, and 28.1% were non-families. 22.9% of all households were made up of individuals, and 11.5% had someone living alone who was 65 years of age or older. The average household size was 2.56 and the average family size was 3.01.

In the CDP, the age distribution of the population shows 28.5% under the age of 18, 5.7% from 18 to 24, 27.2% from 25 to 44, 24.4% from 45 to 64, and 14.2% who were 65 years of age or older. The median age was 37 years. For every 100 females, there were 95.2 males. For every 100 females age 18 and over, there were 95.6 males.

The median income for a household in the CDP was $75,315, and the median income for a family was $78,786. Males had a median income of $39,489 versus $21,250 for females. The per capita income for the CDP was $23,700. None of the population or families were below the poverty line.

Points of interest
 Jim Creek Naval Radio Station

References

Census-designated places in Snohomish County, Washington
Census-designated places in Washington (state)